The Cooper Ministry was a ministry of the Government of Queensland and was led by National Party Premier Russell Cooper and Deputy Premier Bill Gunn. It succeeded the Ahern Ministry on 25 September 1989 following a party-room ballot, and was in turn succeeded by the Goss Ministry on 7 December 1989 following the National government's defeat at the 1989 state election by the Labor Party, led by Wayne Goss. Seven of the outgoing ministry lost their seats at the election.

On 25 September 1989, the Governor designated 18 principal executive offices of the Government and appointed the following Members of the Legislative Assembly of Queensland to the Ministry as follows. As the National Party was not in coalition at the time, all listed members are from that party.

 An earlier Cooper Ministry was headed by Labor Premier Frank Cooper from 1942 until 1946. Both ministries were officially styled "The Cooper Ministry".

References
 

Queensland ministries